Douglas O. Williams (July 29, 1917 – January 31, 1993) was an American sound engineer. He won an Academy Award for Best Sound and was nominated for three more in the same category.

Selected filmography
Williams won an Academy Award and was nominated for three more:

Won
 Patton (1970)

Nominated
 Silver Streak (1976)
 The Turning Point (1977)
 The Rose (1979)

References

External links

American audio engineers
Best Sound Mixing Academy Award winners
1993 deaths
1917 births
20th-century American engineers